Albert L. Robinson (born December 19, 1938) is an American politician and a Republican member of the Kentucky Senate who represented District 21 from January 8, 2013, to January 1, 2021. Robinson served non-consecutively in the Kentucky General Assembly from January 1995 until January 2005 in the Kentucky Senate and non-consecutively from January 1987 until January 1989 and from January 1974 until January 1985 in the Kentucky House of Representatives.

Education
Robinson earned his BS from Cumberland College (now the University of the Cumberlands).

Elections
2020 Robinson was challenged by Brandon Storm and Kay Hensley for the Republican primary. Robinson got second place losing by 744 votes to Brandon Storm meaning he would not be competing in the general election.
2016 Robinson defeated Michael Bryant in the Republican Primary and faced Democratic nominee Janice Odom winning with 33,770 votes (75.12%).
2012 When District 21 Senator Tom Jensen left the Legislature and left the seat open, Robinson was unopposed for the May 22, 2012, Republican Primary and won the November 6, 2012, General election with 20,490 votes (53.8%) against Democratic nominee Amie Hacker.
2004 Robinson was challenged by Tom Jensen in the 2004 Republican Primary and lost; Jensen was unopposed for the November 2, 2004, General election.
2000 Robinson was unopposed for the 2000 Republican Primary and won the November 7, 2000, General election with 20,547 votes (58.0%) against Democratic nominee Lawrence Kuhl.
1996 Robinson won the three-way 1996 Republican Primary and was unopposed for the November 5, 1996, General election.
1994 Running for the Senate District 21 seat, Robinson was unopposed for the 1994 Republican Primary and won the three-way November 8, 1994, General election against Democratic nominee Harold Jones and a write-in candidate.
1970s & 1980s Robinson was elected to the Kentucky House of Representatives in the November 7, 1972, General election and re-elected in the general elections of November 5, 1974, November 2, 1976, November 7, 1978, November 4, 1980, and November 2, 1982, then not re-elected in the general election of November 6, 1984, and re-elected in the general election of November 4, 1986.

References

External links
Official page at the Kentucky General Assembly
Campaign site

Albert Robinson at Ballotpedia
Albert Robinson at the National Institute on Money in State Politics

Place of birth missing (living people)
1938 births
Living people
Republican Party Kentucky state senators
Republican Party members of the Kentucky House of Representatives
People from London, Kentucky
21st-century American politicians